Platymantis luzonensis is a species of frog in the family Ceratobatrachidae.
It is endemic to the rainforest of southeastern Luzon, Philippines.

Its natural habitats are subtropical or tropical moist lowland forest, subtropical or tropical moist montane forest, rural gardens, and heavily degraded former forest.
It is threatened by habitat loss.

References

Platymantis
Amphibians of the Philippines
Taxonomy articles created by Polbot
Amphibians described in 1997